Warsaw is the capital of Poland. This article gives an overview of street names in the city that refer to famous persons, cities or historic events.

In the center of the city (postal code 00-0xx)

Persons
 Krzysztof Kamil Baczyński, 1921–1944, Polish-Jewish poet and Home Army soldier
 Gabriel Boduen
 Juliusz Bursche, 1862–1942, General Superintendent of the Polish Lutheran Church
 Canaletto, 1697–1768, Venetian painter who painted 26 views of Warsaw
 Nicolaus Copernicus, 1473–1543, Polish astronomer and proponent of heliocentrism
 Antonio Corazzi, 1792–1877, Italian architect of the Teatr Wielki, Warsaw
 Tadeusz Czacki, 1765–1813, Polish statesman
 Roman Dmowski, 1864–1939, Polish politician, chief ideologue and co-founder of the National Democratic Party
 Aleksander Fredro, 1793–1876, Polish poet and writer
 Tylman van Gameren, 1632–1706, a Dutch architect and engineer who worked for Queen Maria Kasimira of Poland
 Charles de Gaulle, 1890–1970, former president of France
 Wojciech Górski, 1849–1935, educator
 Kazimierz Karaś, 1711–1775, Polish castellan
 Stanisław Małachowski, 1736–1809, Polish aristocrat
 Emil Młynarski, 1870–1935, Polish conductor and composer
 Emilia Plater, Noblewoman 
 Molière, 1622–1673,  French theatre writer, director and actor, one of the masters of comic satire
 Stanisław Moniuszko, 1819–1872,  Polish conductor, composer, author of many songs, operas, and ballets filled with patriotic and Polish folk themes.
 Vaslav Nijinsky, 1890–1950, a Polish-born Russian ballet dancer and choreographer
 Józef Piłsudski, 1867–1935, Polish revolutionary, statesman and dictator
 Winnie-the-Pooh, cartoon character (Kubusia Puchatka)
 Witold Rowicki, 1914–1989, conductor
 Henryk Sienkiewicz, 1846–1916, Nobel prize winning writer
 Michał Karaszewicz-Tokarzewski, 1893–1964, a Polish general
 Romuald Traugutt, 1826–1864, Polish general
 Julian Tuwim, 1894–1953, Polish poet of Jewish origin
 Stefan Wiechecki, 1896–1979, Polish writer who studied the Warsaw dialect

Groups of people
 the Ossolinski family
 Square of the Warsaw Uprisers (Powstańców Warszawy)
 Solidarity, the Polish trade union federation founded in September 1980 that helped bring down the communist regime (Solidarności)

Places
 Vauxhall, a district of London (Foksal)
 Jerusalem, capital of Israel (Aleje Jerozolimskie)
 Kraków, second largest city in Poland (Krakowskie Przedmieście)
 Mazowsze Voivodeship, largest and most populous of the sixteen Polish administrative regions or voivodships (Mazowiecka)

Miscellaneous
 Mortgage Street (Hipoteczna)
 Credit Street (Kredytowa)
 Royal Street (Królewska)
 Honey Street (Miodowa)
 New World Street (Nowy Świat)
 Holy Cross Street (Swiętokrzyska)
 School Street (Szkolna)
 Hospital Street (Szpitalna)
 Outlook Street (Widok)
 Gold Street (Złota)

In the western part of the city centre (postal code 00-1xx)

Persons
 Władysław Anders, 1892–1970, General in the Polish Army and later  a politician with the Polish government-in-exile in London.
 Mordechaj Anielewicz, 1919–1943, the commander of the Jewish Fighting Organization (Żydowska Organizacja Bojowa) during the Warsaw Ghetto Uprising
 Piotr Drzewiecki, 1865–1943, former president of Warsaw
 Konstanty Grzybowski, 1901–1970, lawyer and historian
 Jozef Lewartowski, 1895–1942, Communist party activist
 Stefan Mirowski, 1920–1996, Harcerstwo (scouting) activist
 John Paul II, 1920–2005, Roman Catholic pope born in Poland (Jana Pawla II)
 Emilia Plater, 1806–1831, Polish revolutionary that fought in the November Uprising
 Ludwig Zamenhof, 1859–1917, initiator of Esperanto

Groups of people
 the Radosław Group of the Armia Krajowa (Zgrupowania AK Radosław)
 Carmelite street (Karmelicka)

Miscellaneous
 Parade Square (Plac Defilad)
 Iron Gate Square (Plac Żelaznej Bramy)
 Swamp street (Bagno)
 Wild street (Dzika)
 Boundary street (Graniczna)
 Problem street (Kłopot)
 Nice street (Miła)
 Nalewki street, named after the main municipal water source located there
 Low street (Niska)
 Orla, after the Polish name for an eagle
 Humble street (Pokorna)
 Transit street (Przechodnia)
 Bird street (Ptasia)
 Dragon street (Smocza)
 Cold street (Zimna)

In the Old Town district (postal code 00-2xx)

Persons
 Bellony
 the mayor's street (Burmistrzowska)
 Wlodzimierz Dolanski, 1886–1973, doctor that treated the blind
 the dean's street (Dziekania)
 , 1880–1942
 St. George's street (Świętojerska)
 Wiktor Gomulicki, 1848–1919, Polish writer
 St. John's street (Świętojanska)
 Jan Kiliński, 1760–1819, commander of the Kościuszko Uprising
 * Roman Sanguszko, 1800–1881, Polish aristocrat, patriot and political activist
 Leon Schiller, 1887–1954, Polish theater director
 Zygmunt Słomiński, president of Warsaw

Miscellaneous
 Birch street (Brzozowa)
 Customs street (Celna)
 Tight street (Ciasna)
 Stone Stairs street (Kamienne Schodki)
 Canon street (Kanonia)
 Church street (Kościelna)
 Crooked Circle street (Krzywe Koło)
 Bridge street (Mostowa)
 Muranów, a district of Warsaw (Muranowska)
 Infantry street (Piesza)
 Beer street (Piwna)
 Street by the Market Square (Przyrynek), next to New Town Market Square
 New Town Market Square (Rynek Nowego Miasta)
 Old Town Market Square (Rynek Starego Miasta)
 Chivalry street (Rycerska)
 Wide and narrow Danube streets (Szeroki and Wąski Dunaj)

Groups of people
 Heroes of the Warsaw Ghetto (Bohaterów Ghetta)
 The Bonifrater Order
 The Franciscan Order
 The Jesuit Order
 The Capuchin Order (Kapucyńska)
 1st Polish Armoured Division (1 Dywizji Pancernej)

Historic events
 Baroque (Barokowa)
 Kościuszko Uprising

On the banks of the Vistula (postal code 00-3xx)

People 
 Julian Bartoszewicz, Polish historian
 Konstanty Ildefons Gałczyński, 1905–1953, Polish poet
 Stefan Jaracz, 1883–1945, Polish actor and director
 Tadeusz Kościuszko (Wybrzeże Kościuszkowskie)
 Emil Konopczyński
 Stanisław Markiewicz Viaduct
 Saint Francis de Sales, 1562–1622, (Franciszka Salezego)
 Julian Smulikowski

Groups of people
 Red Cross street (Czerwonego Krzyża)

Places
 Gdańsk (Wybrzeże Gdańskie)

Miscellaneous
 Side street (Boczna)
 Brewery street (Browarna)
 Quiet street (Cicha)
 Good street (Dobra)
 Wooden street (Drewniana)
 Electric street (Elektryczna)
 Dam street (Tamka)
 Hare street (Zajęcza)

Streets in Warsaw
Warsaw